is a Japanese surname. Notable people with the surname include:

Mahito Tsujimura (born 1930), Japanese voice actor
Michiyo Tsujimura (1888–1969), Japanese agricultural scientist and biochemist
Shūkichi Tsujimura (1910–1991), Japanese photographer
Takeshi Tsujimura (born 1974), Japanese motorcycle racer
Shiro Tsujimura (born 1947), Japanese ceramic artist

See also
14504 Tsujimura main-belt asteroid

Japanese-language surnames